

Preliminary round

Group A

Group B

Group C

Group D

 				
19 lutego 2009

Izrael Izrael 	1:1 	Turcja Turcja 		Neve Marom Hall, Ramat Gan Izrael

Finlandia Finlandia 	4:2 	Czarnogóra Czarnogóra 		Neve Marom Hall, Ramat Gan Izrael

20 lutego 2009

Izrael Izrael 	2:3 	Czarnogóra Czarnogóra 		Neve Marom Hall, Ramat Gan Izrael

Turcja Turcja 	0:2 	Finlandia Finlandia 		Neve Marom Hall, Ramat Gan Izrael

22 lutego 2009

Czarnogóra Czarnogóra 	4:1 	Turcja Turcja 		Neve Marom Hall, Ramat Gan Izrael

Finlandia Finlandia 	2:3 	Izrael Izrael 		Neve Marom Hall, Ramat Gan Izrael

Qualifying round

Group 1

Group 2

TH Title Holder

Group 3

Group 4

Group 5

Group 6

Group 7

External links
 Official UEFA website

Squads
2010